Ban (also Romanized as Bān; also known as Pām) is a village in Shamsabad Rural District, in the Central District of Arak County, Markazi Province, Iran. At the 2006 census, its population was 694, in 188 families.

References 

Populated places in Arak County